Algimantas Vincas Ulba (10 March 1939, in Kaunas – 27 June 2012, in Palanga) was a Lithuanian politician. In 1990 he was among those who signed the Act of the Re-Establishment of the State of Lithuania.

References

1939 births
2012 deaths
Politicians from Kaunas